Thitpin Saung Nat, are Burmese nats (spirits) who serve as guardians of the trees.

They are related to Akathaso and Myay Saung Nat, who respectively live on the sky and earth. Bhummaso are guardian spirits of the earth while Akathaso are guardian spirits of sky.

Gallery

Notes

References

 

Burmese nats
Tree deities